Oxbow is a Canadian community in Victoria County, New Brunswick. It is located 15 km north of Plaster Rock along the west bank of the Tobique River along Route 385.

History

Oxbow was the site of the last public school to operate in the parish of Lorne, Oxbow Elementary School, which closed in the 1990s.

Notable people

See also
List of communities in New Brunswick

References

Communities in Victoria County, New Brunswick